Eugene "Ted" Michael Joseph Patrick Melaniphy (5 February 1912 – 3 June 1991) played as a footballer in the Football League in the 1930s. He was born in Westport, Ireland.

He made his debut for Plymouth Argyle in the 1931-32 season, and played his last game for them in 1935-36, playing a total of 68 Football League Second Division games for them, scoring 33 times. He scored a hat-trick for them on 7 October 1933.

He joined Cardiff City for the 1936-37 season and played 20 league matches for them, scoring 8 goals. After a short spell with Worcester City he joined Northampton Town for the 1939-40 season, but the season was abandoned due to the war after only a few games.

References

External links
 Plymouth stats and photo at Greens on Screen

20th-century Irish people
1912 births
1991 deaths
Irish expatriate sportspeople in Wales
Association footballers from County Mayo
Republic of Ireland association footballers
Association football forwards
English Football League players
Plymouth Argyle F.C. players
Cardiff City F.C. players
Northampton Town F.C. players
Irish expatriate sportspeople in England
Redhill F.C. players
Republic of Ireland expatriate association footballers
Expatriate footballers in Wales
Expatriate footballers in England